SKZ2020 is the first compilation album by South Korean boy band Stray Kids. It was released on March 18, 2020, through Epic Records Japan, and JYP Entertainment, as the group's Japanese debut release. This   consists of twenty-seven tracks that the group had released previously, but re-recorded versions consisting of their current lineup, following  the departure of Woojin from the group in late October 2019. 

SKZ2020 preceded by the Japanese version of "My Pace", "Double Knot", and "Levanter". In Japan, the album was released physically in four versions: first press limited, regular, period time limited, and complete limited edition (cassette tape). SKZ2020 debuted at number three on both the Oricon Albums Chart, and the Billboard Japan Hot Albums, selling 36,347 copies in Japan as of March 2020. In the United States, the album entered the Billboard World Albums at number fourteen, selling 1,000 units in its first week.

Track listing 

 

Notes
  Signifies an additional lyricist
 The album's CD package of first press limited and regular editions consists of two discs; one containing tracks 1-14, and the other with tracks 15-27.
 The Korean version of SKZ2020 ordered the Japanese version track to be the last three tracks, while the international version were not included, but released standalone instead.

Charts

Weekly charts

Monthly charts

Year-end charts

Certifications

Release history

References

External links
  

2020 compilation albums
Japanese-language compilation albums
JYP Entertainment albums
Korean-language compilation albums
Stray Kids albums